Gródek  is a village in Białystok County, Podlaskie Voivodeship, in north-eastern Poland, close to the border with Belarus. It is the seat of the gmina (administrative district) called Gmina Gródek.

The village has a population of 2,900.

References

Villages in Białystok County
Belostoksky Uyezd
Białystok Voivodeship (1919–1939)
Belastok Region